Snooker at the 1960 Summer Paralympics consisted of a men's event. It was held at the Tre Fontane Sports Ground, Rome. There were four competitors, from three different countries: two from Great Britain, and one each from Italy and Malta. Cliff Keaton won the gold medal. The event was played outdoors, in a covered area of a running track, on a table brought over from Stoke Mandeville Hospital.

Medal summary

References 

 

1960 Summer Paralympics events
1960
Paralympics